Jason Sean McCarthy (born 7 November 1995) is an English footballer who plays as a defender for  club Wycombe Wanderers.

Club career

Southampton
McCarthy is a youth product of the Southampton F.C. Academy. He made his only Premier League appearance on 26 December 2014 against Crystal Palace, when he replaced Nathaniel Clyne after 87 minutes in a 3–1 away victory.

Wycombe Wanderers (loan)
In October 2015, McCarthy signed a loan deal until February with Wycombe Wanderers, with the deal later extended until the end of the season. At the end of the season, he was voted Supporters' Player of the Year.

Walsall (loan)
On 28 June 2016, McCarthy was sent out on loan to Walsall for the first half of the season. He scored his first goal for Walsall in a 1–0 win over Bolton Wanderers on 17 September 2016.

On 1 January 2017, McCarthy's loan to Walsall was extended until the end of the 2016–17 season.

At the end of the season, he was crowned the Fans Player of the Season after playing every minute of every game in the 2016–17 season for the Saddlers.

Barnsley
On 13 June 2017, he joined Barnsley for an undisclosed fee on a three-year deal.

Wycombe Wanderers 
On 9 August 2018, McCarthy returned to Wycombe Wanderers where he had previously been on loan, signing for an undisclosed fee on a three-year deal. McCarthy won the Supporters' Player of the Year Award for the 2018–19 season.

Millwall 
On 30 July 2019, he was transferred to Millwall for an undisclosed fee on a three-year deal.

Wycombe Wanderers (second loan)
On 18 January 2020, McCarthy once again rejoined Wycombe Wanderers on loan until the end of the 2019–20 season.

Wycombe Wanderers (second permanent spell)
On 25 August 2020, McCarthy rejoined Wycombe Wanderers for a fourth time, signing a three-year contract for an undisclosed fee.

Career statistics

Honours

Club
Southampton
 U21 Premier League Cup: 2014–15

Individual
Walsall Player of the Year: 2016–17

References

External links

Profile on Barnsley F.C. website

1995 births
Living people
Footballers from Southampton
English footballers
Association football defenders
Premier League players
Southampton F.C. players
Wycombe Wanderers F.C. players
Walsall F.C. players
Barnsley F.C. players
Millwall F.C. players
English Football League players